Reported Missing is a 1922 American silent comedy film directed by Henry Lehrman and starring Owen Moore, Pauline Garon, and Tom Wilson.

Plot
As described in a film magazine review, Richard Boyd comes into possession of the Boyd Shipping Company through inheritance. The company has an option to obtain a huge fleet of ships much sought after by Young, a scheming Asian shipping magnate. Boyd, a habitual idler, is disinterested in the matter until Pauline makes him get down to business and save these ships for America. Young kidnaps Richard and Pauline on a ship and puts out to sea. The ship becomes stranded. Richard's uncle demands that Young return them. Young takes Pauline captive on his ship while Richard is rescued by a battleship and pursues them in a Navy hydroplane. Young wins this race, but Richard goes to his house and rescues the young woman, Young being killed in the fight.

Cast

Production
Consistent with the practice at that time, the comic role of the valet Sam was played by Wilson in blackface. The use of white actors in blackface for black character roles in Hollywood films did not begin to decline until the late 1930s, and is now considered highly offensive, disrespectful, and racist.

Preservation
Reported Missing is a lost film with only a fragment remaining.

References

Bibliography
 Langman, Larry. Destination Hollywood: The Influence of Europeans on American Filmmaking. McFarland & Co., 2000.

External links

 

1922 films
1922 comedy films
1920s English-language films
American silent feature films
Silent American comedy films
American black-and-white films
Films directed by Henry Lehrman
Selznick Pictures films
1920s American films
English-language comedy films